The 2022 Tunis Open was a professional tennis tournament played on clay courts. It was the 12th edition of the tournament which was part of the 2022 ATP Challenger Tour. It took place in Tunis, Tunisia between 16 and 21 May 2022.

Singles main-draw entrants

Seeds

 1 Rankings are as of 9 May 2022.

Other entrants
The following players received wildcards into the singles main draw:
  Moez Echargui
  Skander Mansouri
  Aziz Ouakaa

The following players received entry into the singles main draw as alternates:
  Michael Geerts
  Calvin Hemery
  Malek Jaziri
  Peđa Krstin

The following players received entry from the qualifying draw:
  Rémy Bertola
  Miguel Damas
  Alexander Erler
  Felix Gill
  Carlos Sánchez Jover
  Aldin Šetkić

Champions

Singles

 Roberto Carballés Baena def.  Gijs Brouwer 6–1, 6–1.

Doubles

 Nicolás Barrientos /  Miguel Ángel Reyes-Varela def.  Alexander Erler /  Lucas Miedler 6–7(3–7), 6–3, [11–9].

References

2022 ATP Challenger Tour
2022
2022 in Tunisian sport
May 2022 sports events in Africa